George T. (Ted) Hopkins  (May 11, 1902 – March 14, 1955) was a professional American football player in the early National Football League for the Columbus Panhandles. He was a teammate, of the Panhandles' infamous Nesser Brothers. However, he was also a nephew to the brothers, since his mother Anna was their sister. His cousin, Charlie Nesser, and uncle, John Schneider played on the team as well.

Ted only played briefly with the team from 1921 until 1922.

References
Forgotten NFL Family: the Nesser Brothers of Columbus, Ohio

1900s births
1973 deaths
Players of American football from Canton, Ohio
Columbus Panhandles players
Nesser family (American football)